Perring is a surname. Notable people with the surname include:

Christian Perring (born 1962), American philosopher
George Perring (1884–1960), American baseball player
James Ernest Perring (1822–1889), British opera singer, voice trainer and composer
John Perring (disambiguation), multiple people
William Perring (1866–1937), British politician

See also
Perring baronets, two British baronetcies